Italy competed at the 1900 Summer Olympics in Paris, France.

Medalists

Results by event

Aquatics

Swimming

Italy had two swimmers compete in 1900, the nation's first appearance in the sport. Maioni and Bussetti each advanced to one event final, taking 6th and 7th place, respectively.

Athletics

In Italy's first appearance on the athletics program, two Italian athletes entered three events.  They did not advance to the finals in any event and won no medals.

 Track events

Cycling

Italy's first cycling appearance was at the second Olympic cycling competition, 1900.  Seven cyclists from Italy competed in two events, winning a gold medal in the points race.

Track

Equestrian

Italy had several competitors at the first Olympic equestrian events. The names of some or all of these are known. Trissino competed on multiple horses in the high jump. Elvira Guerra, Italy's first female Olympian, competed in the hacks and hunter combined.

Fencing

Italy first competed in fencing at the Olympics in the sport's second appearance.  The nation sent 12 fencers, winning the top two places in the masters sabre event.

Gymnastics

Italy's first appearance in Olympic gymnastics competition was at the second gymnastics tournament, in 1900. The one Italian gymnast won no medals in a heavily France-dominated single event.

Rowing

Italy had one rower compete in 1900.

Notes

References

External links
 Italy at the 1900 Paris Summer Games
 

Nations at the 1900 Summer Olympics
1900
Olympics